A whoopee cap is a style of headwear popular among youths in the mid 20th century in the United States. It was often made from a man's felt fedora hat with the brim trimmed with a scalloped cut and turned up. In the 1920s and 1930s, such caps usually indicated the wearer was a mechanic. The headwear can often be seen worn in the films of the Dead End Kids. It is also referred to as a Jughead hat (so named after comic book character Jughead Jones, for whom the hat became an iconic piece), palookaville cap, devils cap, clubhouse hat, dink cap, rat cap, or Kingpin.

See also

 Fedora
 Beanie

References

Hats